This article is a list of banks in San Marino. Banks are to be listed alphabetically in order of name, its official website, if a bank has one, and its 8-letter SWIFT code. The list is based on information from the Central Bank of San Marino, which is responsible for financial supervision in San Marino.

Notes

 
Banks
San Marino
San Marino